The Open Content Project was a project dedicated to free culture and Creative Commons.

One goal was to evangelize the concept of open content. The project's Open Publication License, primarily designed and offered for academics, could easily be adapted to the needs of the artist or other content provider.

The Open Content Project has closed in 2003 and has been succeeded by Creative Commons.

References

External links
Opencontent

Open content projects